The Du Toitskloof Mountains (Dutoitsberge) are a range in the Cape Fold Belt in the Western Cape Province of South Africa.  The highest point is Du Toits Peak (Dutoitspiek) which is the highest seaward facing peak in the Cape Fold Belt ranges, i.e. the highest peak in the Western Cape within direct sight of the ocean. 

Located between Paarl and Worcester in the south-west of South Africa,  to the north-east of the provincial capital of Cape Town, the mountains form a formidable barrier between Cape Town and the rest of Africa. The N1 highway, also called the Cape to Cairo Road crosses them at the Du Toitskloof Pass. Sometimes the Du Toitskloof Mountains together with the Wemmershoek Mountains and others are called the Klein Drakenstein, but it is more usually considered part of the greater Boland mountain range.

Structurally, the mountains form part of the Cape Syntaxis, a complex portion of the Cape Fold Belt where the north-south trending ranges meet the east-west trending ranges in a complex series of folds and thrusts.  The range mostly consists of Table Mountain sandstone, an erosion-resistant quatzitic sandstone. Vegetation is almost exclusively montane fynbos of the Cape floristic region. The rest of the mountains are barren rocks and steep cliffs. Precipitation occurs primarily in the winter months as rain on the lower slopes and as snow higher up, usually above 1000m. Climate varies dramatically, with the surrounding valleys being up to 10°C (18°F) warmer than the mountains. The climate falls within the Mediterranean type. 

The Limietberg Nature Reserve, known for its mountain fynbos, is located in the Du Toitskloof Mountains.

See also
 List of Ultras of Africa

References

External links

"Du Toits Peak, South Africa" on Peakbagger

Mountains of the Western Cape